Commerce is an unincorporated community in Wilson County, Tennessee, United States.

History
Commerce was platted in 1822. A post office called Commerce was established in 1831, and remained in operation until 1903.

The Bailey Graveyard, which is listed on the National Register of Historic Places, is located in Commerce.

References

Unincorporated communities in Tennessee
Unincorporated communities in Wilson County, Tennessee